Arene laguairana is a species of sea snail, a marine gastropod mollusk in the family Areneidae.

References

External links
 To Encyclopedia of Life
 To World Register of Marine Species

Areneidae
Gastropods described in 1962